The 1904 Nobel Prize in Literature was the fourth literary prize resulting from Alfred Nobel's will. It was equally divided between the French Provençal philologist Frédéric Mistral (1830–1914) "in recognition of the fresh originality and true inspiration of his poetic production, which faithfully reflects the natural scenery and native spirit of his people, and, in addition, his significant work as a Provençal philologist" and  the Spanish engineer and dramatist José Echegaray Eizaguirre (1832–1916) "in recognition of the numerous and brilliant compositions which, in an individual and original manner, have revived the great traditions of the Spanish drama." The winners were announced in October 1904 by Carl David af Wirsén, permanent secretary of the Swedish Academy.

It was the first of the four occasions (1917, 1966, and 1974) when the Nobel Prize in Literature has been shared between two individuals.

Laureates

Frédéric Mistral 
 
Mistral’s passion for poetry was sparked by one of his teachers, the Provençal poet Joseph Roumanille. He spent many years compiling Trésor dóu Félibrige, a dictionary of the Provençal language published by the Felibrige literary society, which he founded himself. His most important work, Mirèio, was published in 1859, the result of eight years of work. He also authored Lou Tresor dóu Félibrige (1878–1886), which to date remains the most comprehensive dictionary of the Occitan language, and one of the most reliable, thanks to the precision of its definitions. It is a bilingual dictionary, Occitan-French, in two large volumes, with all of the dialects of oc, including Provençal. Mistral owes to François Vidal the work of typesetting and revising that dictionary.

José Echegaray Eizaguirre

Echegaray’s literary debut took place relatively late, in 1874 when he was 42 years old. He subsequently had a productive career, publishing an average of two plays a year for the rest of his life. A mathematician, engineer and administrator, he built his plays with the same regard for exactitude and duty that inspired his public life. Conflicts involving duty are at the heart of most of his plays, and he upheld the idea with uncompromising severity. His exalted romanticism is apparent in his choice of subjects. His most famous plays include El gran Galeoto (adapted into a silent film entitled "The World and His Wife"), La esposa del vengador ("The Avenger's Wife", 1874), and Conflicto entre dos deberes ("Conflict of Two Duties", 1882). He also extensively wrote 25 to 30 mathematical physics volumes.

Deliberations

Nominations
For the 1904 prize, the Swedish Academy received 29 nominations for 21 individuals. Among the nominees were Albert Sorel, Anatole France (awarded later in 1921), Leo Tolstoy, Henrik Ibsen, Algernon Charles Swinburne, Rudyard Kipling (awarded in 1907), and Henryk Sienkiewicz (awarded later in 1905). Two of the nominees were women, Swedish novelist Selma Lagerlöf (awarded later in 1909) and French actress Émilie Lerou.

The authors Edwin Arnold, Anton Chekhov, Kate Chopin, Karl Emil Franzos, Lafcadio Hearn, Theodor Herzl, Wilhelm Jordan, Mór Jókai, Antonio Labriola, Dumitru Theodor Neculuță, Auguste Molinier, Larin Paraske, Ștefan Petică, Abai Qunanbaiuly, Samuel Smiles, Leslie Stephen, Hans von Hopfen, and Jose Clemente Zulueta died in 1904 without having been nominated for the prize.

Prize decision
It was later revealed that the Swedish Academy's official justification for a shared prize is not supported by how the Academy actually made their decision. The shared prize was in fact a compromise solution, caused by certain incompetence by the Nobel committee during the process. The committee had agreed on that Mistral should be awarded the prize when they were presented with a poor translation of one of Mistral's major works by committee member Rupert Nyblom. The committee chairman Carl David af Wirsén was worried about the reputation of the committee and proposed withdrawing Mistral's candidacy and opting for Echegaray instead. He could however only find fifty per cent support for this proposal and, as a compromise, it was decided to share the prize between the two men.

Award Ceremony
At the award ceremony in December 10, 1904, af Wirsén said: 

Echegaray was not able to partake in nobel banquet and the awarding ceremony in Stockholm due to health conditions.

Notes

References

External links
Award ceremony speech by C.D. af Wirsén nobelprize.org

1904
Frédéric Mistral